The Mergenthaler Linotype Company is a corporation founded in the United States in 1886 to market the Linotype machine, a system to cast metal type in lines (linecaster) invented by Ottmar Mergenthaler. It became the world's leading manufacturer of book and newspaper typesetting equipment; outside North America, its only serious challenger for book typesetting was the Anglo-American Monotype Corporation. Starting in 1960, the Mergenthaler Linotype Company became a major supplier of phototypesetting equipment which included laser typesetters, typefonts, scanners, typesetting computers. In 1987, the US-based Mergenthaler Linotype Company became part of the German Linotype-Hell AG; in the US the company name changed to Linotype Co. In 1996, the German Linotype-Hell AG was taken over by the German printing machine company Heidelberger Druckmaschinen AG. A separate business, Linotype Library GmbH was established to manage the digital assets. In 2005, Linotype Library GmbH shortened its name to Linotype GmbH, and in 2007, Linotype GmbH was acquired by Monotype Imaging Holdings, Inc., the parent of Monotype Imaging, Inc. and others.

Founding

The invention of a machine to replace the labor-intensive task of setting type by hand had been tackled by many inventors during the 19th century. The most time consumed was not in creating the text, but in returning the characters to their proper position for future use. Mergenthaler solved this problem by placing a type mold for a letter on the side of a specially keyed matrix (with multiple matrix/molds available for any given letter). The linotype operator would type in a line of text. The machine would drop each matrix with its mold into place, assembling the matrices into a line of text that was needed. Hot lead alloy was then forced into the molds of matrices, creating the fresh line of type. 

The linotype operator would then go on to type in the next line. Multiple lines would be stacked into blocks, sometimes paragraphs, to be set in place in the proper column of the page layout. Meanwhile, back inside the linotype machine, the matrices used for a line 
would progress through the machine, where the special keying system on one end of the matrix, unique for each character, would allow the matrix to drop back only into the correct storage slot, ready for the next use. Another benefit of this overall process was that each edition of the paper was created from a fresh casting of metal, thus avoiding problems of type wear. 

Another problem Mergenthaler solved was in justifying the type, or ensuring that in a column of print, there were flush margins on the left and right. Hand compositors had previously done this by using spaces of different widths in a line, to ensure that the lines all ended at the same point. Mergenthaler adapted the "space band" (patented by J. W. Schuckers), a device consisting of two wedges of metal connected loosely. When a line of type was being justified, all the space band wedges would be pushed up in two passes to spread the line out to the full measure being cast. The space bands were stored for reuse in a different location from the matrices.

History
The invention of the first working Linotype was a long, arduous and intricate process that involved many players and the creation of a long succession of companies.

In 1877, the National Printing Company was organized under the laws of the District of Columbia and Lewis Clephane, the brother of James O. Clephane, was elected president.  After the first successful trial of the Linotype in October, 1885, the Mergenthaler Printing Company was established to raise fresh capital from the shareholders of the National Printing Company. Finally, The Mergenthaler Linotype Company was formed in New York in 1895. Philip Tell Dodge served as its first president until 1928 when his son Norman Dodge replaced him. The Mergenthaler Linotype Company of New York, the organization's newest iteration, was launched with $5,000,000 capital (in 1895 dollars), and $10,000,000 (in 1895 dollars) in stock holdings across 333 investors. 

In 1889 The Linotype Company, a British offshoot of the firm, was formed by Joseph Lawrence, publisher of The Railway Magazine. In 1899, a new factory in Broadheath, Altrincham was opened. In 1903, the British company merged with Machinery Trust to form Linotype & Machinery Ltd.

Mergenthaler Linotype dominated the printing industry through the twentieth century. The machines were so well designed, major parts remained virtually unchanged for nearly 100 years. A particularly notable success was Linotype's Legibility Group of typefaces, used by most of the world's (Latin-alphabet) newspapers for much of the twentieth century. The ruggedness of the Linotype system, which cast lines as solid bars of type, aided this dominance.

Linotype Company was merged with Mergenthaler acquisition K. S. Paul to form Linotype-Paul Ltd which developed a range of Linotron phototypesetters using K. S. Paul's cathode ray tube technology.

The company, as so many in the printing industry, endured a complex post-war history, during which printing technology went through two revolutions — first moving to phototypesetting, then to digital.

During the 1950s, the Davidson Corporation, which manufactured a series of small offset presses, was a subsidiary of Linotype. This was later sold to American Type Founders and operated under the name ATF-Davidson.

Through a series of mergers and reorganizations, the business of Mergenthaler Linotype Company ultimately vested in Linotype-Hell AG, a German company. In April 1997, Linotype-Hell AG was acquired by Heidelberger Druckmaschinen AG. The following month certain divisions of Linotype-Hell AG were spun off into new companies, one of which was Linotype Library GmbH with headquarters at Bad Homburg vor der Höhe. This new company was responsible solely for the acquisition, creation and distribution of digital fonts and related software. This spin-off effectively divorced the company's font software business from the older typesetting business which was retained by Heidelberg. In 2005, Linotype Library GmbH shortened its name to Linotype GmbH, and in 2007, Linotype GmbH was acquired by Monotype Imaging Holdings, Inc., the parent of Monotype Imaging, Inc. and others.

Typefaces
The typefaces in the Linotype type library are the artwork of some of the most famous typeface designers of the 20th century. The library contains such famous trademarked typefaces as Palatino and Optima by Hermann Zapf; Frutiger, Avenir and Univers by Adrian Frutiger; and Helvetica by Max Miedinger and Eduard Hoffman. Linotype GmbH frequently brings out new designs from both established and new type designers. Linotype had also introduced FontExplorer X for Mac OS X. It was a well-reviewed font manager that allows users to browse and purchase new fonts within the program — a business model similar to that used by iTunes and the iTunes Store.

The simplified Arabic typeface Yakout, named for the 13th-century Islamic calligrapher Yaqut al-Musta'simi, was released by Linotype in 1956, and remains one of the most common Arabic typefaces for books and newspapers.

See also
Hot-metal typesetting
Chauncey Hawley Griffith

References

Further reading
Manfred Raether: „Linotype – Chronik eines Firmennamens“; E-Book, self-published, Schöneck 2009
Basil Kahan: Ottmar Mergenthaler – The Man and his Machine; Oak Knoll Press, New Castle (DE), 2000 – 

External links

Linotype – Chronik eines Firmennamens (Linotype – Chronologie of a Company Name): e-book covering the history of Linotype, starting in 1886
Typophile: Linotype Article

Metal Type — For Those who Remember Hot Metal Typesetting
Linotypesetting - Hot Metal Typesetting for Hobbyists and the Trade
The Linotype & Machinery Co. Ltd - information sheet on the UK company from the Museum of Science and Industry (Manchester)
Chauncey Hawley Griffith papers at the University of Kentucky (Mergenthaler's Vice President for Typographic Development)

Letterpress font foundries
Letterpress font foundries of the United States
Cold type foundries
Commercial type foundries
Companies established in 1886